Microweiseini is a tribe of ladybird beetles.

Genera
The taxonomy of this group has recently been revised.
Amongst those genera that have been included within it are:
 Coccidophilus
 Cryptoweisea
 Diloponis
 Hong
 Microcapillata
 Microfreudea
 Microweisea
 Nipus
 Pseudosmilia
 Sarapidus
 Stictospilus

Fossil genera:
 Baltosidis gen. nov. 
 B. damgaardi sp. nov.
 B. damzeni sp. nov.
 B. szadziewskii sp. nov.

References

External links
Wikispecies entry

Polyphaga tribes
Coccinellidae